Brasca may refer to:

Brașca, Romanian village which with the village Ilișești form part of Ilișești, a commune located in Suceava County, Romania
Patrick Brasca, Canadian-Taiwanese pop singer and songwriter

See also
Brascan, earlier name of Brookfield Asset Management